Milton Darrell Osteen (February 14, 1943 – October 22, 2017) was an American professional baseball player for the Cincinnati Reds and the Oakland Athletics from 1965 to 1970. A right-handed pitcher, he was signed as an amateur free agent in 1962 by the Reds, and was traded to the Athletics on November 21, 1967.

Career
He was a graduate of Putnam City High School in Oklahoma City, Oklahoma, where he was named 1961 Player of the Year in the Oklahoma City area.

Osteen's professional career extended from 1962 to 1967 and 1970–1971. He made his major league debut on September 2, 1965 against the Braves in Cincinnati's Crosley Field, relieving Gerry Arrigo and pitching two scoreless innings in a 4–3 Reds loss. The first batter he faced was opposing starting pitcher Hank Fischer, who grounded out. Osteen was traded with Rob Gardner from the Oakland Athletics to the New York Yankees for Curt Blefary on May 25, 1971.

He served in the military in 1968 and 1969. In parts of four Major League seasons, he pitched in 29 games and had a 1–4 record with an 8.05 earned run average.

References

External links
, or Baseball Reference (Minor and Mexican Leagues), or Retrosheet, or Pelota Binaria (Venezuelan Winter League)

1943 births
2017 deaths
American expatriate baseball players in Mexico
Baseball players from Oklahoma
Buffalo Bisons (minor league) players
Cafeteros de Córdoba players
Cangrejeros de Santurce (baseball) players
Cardenales de Lara players
American expatriate baseball players in Venezuela
Cincinnati Reds players
Iowa Oaks players
Knoxville Smokies players
Liga de Béisbol Profesional Roberto Clemente pitchers
Macon Peaches players
Major League Baseball pitchers
Mexican League baseball pitchers
Military personnel from Oklahoma
Oakland Athletics players
Oklahoma State Cowboys baseball players
Rocky Mount Leafs players
San Diego Padres (minor league) players
Saraperos de Saltillo players
Sportspeople from Oklahoma City
Syracuse Chiefs players
Tampa Tarpons (1957–1987) players